Giacomo Francesco Bussani was a Venetian librettist.

He wrote seven known librettos; 5 for Antonio Sartorio, and one each for Carlo Pallavicino and Pietro Agostini. Among those he set for Sartorio was Giulio Cesare in Egitto, which was later adapted by  Nicola Francesco Haym for Georg Friedrich Händel's Giulio Cesare.

Notes

Italian librettists